Hispo striolata is a species of jumping spider (family Salticidae). The species is endemic to Mahé Island, Silhouette Island and Praslin Island of Seychelles.

References

Salticidae
Spiders of Africa
Fauna of Seychelles
Spiders described in 1898